The 1896 Defense of Van or Van Rebellion was a revolt by the Armenian population in Van against the armed forces of the Ottoman Empire in June 1896 during the Hamidian massacres.

Background 
The Van region had avoided the earlier stages of the Hamidian massacres in 1895. However, by January 1896 there was increasing violence – a report by the British vice-consul in Van, W. H. Williams, said that many Armenian villages had been looted and "Armenians are everywhere in a state bordering on panic, afraid lest the spring will bring still further disasters".
The Ottoman authorities eventually sent an expedition to attack the Armenian population of Van in June 1896.

Defense and massacre 

Between 3 and 11 June some six to seven hundred Armenian men defended the Armenian sections of the Aigestan (Garden City) district of the city. After a week of fighting, the sultan sought assistance from the Western powers to end the violence, promising that he would guarantee the lives and safety of the Armenians of Van. After some negotiations, and making clear they had been acting in self-defense in the face of continual massacre, the Armenian defenders agreed to leave for Persia, escorted by Ottoman troops. En route, as nearly 1,000 Armenians marched towards the border, they were massacred by Ottoman troops and Kurdish tribesmen. This was followed by further massacres throughout the Van region. Vice-consul Williams estimated that some 20,000 Armenians had been killed and some 350 Armenian villages destroyed.

Aftermath
In July 1897, an Armenian Fedayee group undertook a revenge attack, known as the Khanasor Expedition, against the Kurdish Mazrig tribe that had been responsible for the massacre of the defenders of Van when they were moving towards the Persian border.

See also
Defense of Van (1915)

References

1896 in the Ottoman Empire
Armenian national liberation movement
Van vilayet
History of Van, Turkey
Hamidian massacres
June 1896 events